Hanevold or Hannevord is a Norwegian surname. Notable people with the surname include:

Hanevord
Halvard Hanevold (1969—2019), Norwegian biathlete
Ingjerd Hanevold (born 1955), Norwegian jewelry designer
Kaja Hanevold (born 1980), Norwegian figure skater

Hannevord
Per Hannevold (born 1953), Norwegian classical musician

Norwegian-language surnames